Novak Djokovic defeated the defending champion Roger Federer in the final, 7–6(7–2), 2–6, 7–6(7–2) to win the men's singles tennis title at the 2007 Canadian Open. With the win, he became the first man to beat the world's top three players in one event since Boris Becker in 1994 in Stockholm, having also defeated Rafael Nadal and Andy Roddick en route to the final.

Seeds
The top eight seeds receive a bye into the second round.

Draw

Finals

Top half

Section 1

Section 2

Bottom half

Section 3

Section 4

References

External links
 Main draw
 Qualifying draw

Masters - Singles